Abbott is an unincorporated community in Hall County, Nebraska, United States.

History
A post office was established in Abbott in 1887, and remained in operation until it was discontinued in 1937. The community was named for Othman A. Abbott, the first Lieutenant Governor of Nebraska.  In 1938, Abbott had about 75 inhabitants.  Abbott was located on the Burlington railroad.

References

Unincorporated communities in Hall County, Nebraska
Unincorporated communities in Nebraska